Batracobdella is a genus of Glossiphoniidae. This genus is valid in Europe. But in North America, it has been synonymized to Desserobdella.

The genus was described in 1897 by Viguier.

Species:
Batracobdella algira (Moquin-Tandon, 1846)
Batracobdella paludosa (Carena, 1824)

References

Leeches